Crouch End Festival Chorus (CEFC) is a symphonic choir based in north London which performs in a range of musical styles, including traditional choral repertoire, contemporary classical, rock, pop and film music.

Led by musical director David Temple, the choir has appeared in the BBC Proms concert series and has performed under the baton of conductors including Esa Pekka-Salonen, Semyon Bychkov, Edward Gardner and Valery Gergiev. CEFC also features on the sound track of films and TV series such as Disney's Prince Caspian, the BBC's Doctor Who and Amazon Prime Video's Good Omens TV series.

CEFC's patrons include the conductor Sir Mark Elder, bass-baritone Bryn Terfel, film music composer Hans Zimmer, rock artists Ray Davies and Noel Gallagher, with whom the choir has performed live and in the recording studio and its co-founder, John Gregson.

David Temple was appointed MBE in the New Year's Honours List in January 2018 for his services to music.

History and organisation 
In 1984 John Gregson, the director of the then Crouch End Arts Festival, invited David Temple to become the Festivals's music director. Gregson suggested that the festival should have its own choir and invited Temple to become its chorus master. A scratch choir of amateur singers was formed to perform Verdi's Requiem and the choir was given the name Crouch End Festival Chorus.  Its membership has grown to around 150 singers who rehearse weekly in Muswell Hill and perform at Alexandra Palace Theatre, and at venues across London including the Barbican Hall, Royal Festival Hall, Queen Elizabeth Hall, and Royal Albert Hall.

CEFC is a charitable company run by a board of trustees elected by its members, with the day-to-day functions of the organisation carried out by a management committee of volunteers from the choir's ranks. Members join the choir via a formal audition and all singers are re-auditioned every three years.

Classical repertoire 

At its own concerts CEFC performs choral music over a wide chronological range from Thomas Tallis in the sixteenth century to new commissions. Over the course of its existence up to summer 2022 it has performed the work of 113 composers from John Adams to Hans Zimmer. The major British composers, Elgar, Vaughan Williams, Tippett and Britten feature regularly on concert programmes, as do European composers including Bach, Beethoven, Mozart, Felix Mendelssohn, Poulenc and Stravinsky, and Americans including Bernstein, John Adams and Philip Glass. In recent years CEFC has sought to include women composers in its programmes, including Fanny Mendelssohn Hensel, Rani Arbo, and Lillie Harris, and commissions from Jessica Curry and Laura Bowler.

Commissions 
CEFC has a long history of commissioning and performing new choral works.

Other Classical Concerts 

CEFC have appeared regularly at the BBC Proms since 2001.

CEFC is also frequently invited to collaborate with major orchestras. Recent performances include Britten's War Requiem with the BBC Symphony Orchestra and Chorus under Semyon Bychkov in November 2013, Berlioz's Grande Messe des Morts with the BBC Symphony Chorus and Orchestra under François-Xavier Roth in November 2016, Prokofiev's Cantata for the 20th Anniversary of the October Revolution with the Philharmonia Orchestra under Vladimir Ashkenazy in May 2018 and Beethoven's Symphony No. 9 with the Philharmonia under Jakub Hrůša in April 2022.

Popular music 
In 2010, CEFC singers joined patron and regular collaborator Ray Davies on stage at the Glastonbury Festival performing to an audience of 50,000 people. The following year, the choir appeared again with Ray Davies in the final concert of the Meltdown Festival curated by the artist for the Royal Festival Hall. Also in 2011 came a performance with Basement Jaxx at the Barbican.

CEFC's working relationship with Noel Gallagher began in 2008 with an Oasis gig for the BBC's Electric Proms. After contributing to the debut album by Noel Gallagher's High Flying Birds in 2012, the choir toured with the band throughout the UK, and again in 2015.

Film and TV 
CEFC features on a number of original film soundtracks including The Awakening (2011) Prince Caspian (2008), and Rocketman (2019) as well as in music composed for the BBC's classic sci-fi series Dr Who. Composers Hans Zimmer and Ennio Morricone have both booked CEFC to perform in live concerts of their music.

Recordings
The choir has made recordings of Bach's St John Passion and Britten's Saint Nicolas and A Ceremony of Carols, conducted by David Temple. They have also recorded Parry's Judith, conducted by William Vann.

The choir has credits on more than one hundred CDs including albums by Lesley Garrett, Katherine Jenkins, Alfie Boe, and Kate Royal, and by rock and pop artists Travis, The Divine Comedy, Robbie Williams, Ray Davies, and Noel Gallagher's High Flying Birds. Ray Davies' The Kinks Choral Collection featuring CEFC reached the UK top 30 best-selling albums in 2009 and Noel Gallagher's High Flying Birds achieved the top spot in the Official UK Chart in 2011.

References

External links
 Crouch End Festival Chorus

London choirs
Classical music in the United Kingdom
Musical groups established in 1984
Crouch End